Jason Pagaspas Webb (born September 23, 1973) is a Filipino basketball coach and former basketball player.

Playing career
Webb played collegiate basketball for the De La Salle Green Archers from 1991 to 1995. After college, he played for Stag/Tanduay in the Philippine Basketball League (1995-1997).

Webb began his PBA career in 1997 with the Sta. Lucia Realtors. After two seasons, he played for the Tanduay Rhum Masters (1999-2001).

TV commentator
Webb was a color commentator/game analyst for PBA on Sports5 from 2011 to 2014.
Webb return as color commentator/game analyst for UAAP from 2021 to present.

Coaching career
Webb began his coaching career as an assistant coach for the Star Hotshots in June 2014 and was appointed as its head coach in July 2015. On October 14, 2016, he was appointed as team consultant after being replaced as head coach by Chito Victolero.

Coaching record

PBA

Personal life
Webb is one of the sons of former Philippine senator Freddie Webb. He is the brother of Pinky Webb and Hubert Webb. Webb was formerly married to CNN Philippines (formerly 9News) anchor Claudine Trillo. He is currently in a relationship with actress Mylene Dizon.

References

Living people
1973 births
Basketball players from Metro Manila
Filipino men's basketball coaches
Filipino men's basketball players
Philippine Basketball Association All-Stars
Philippine Basketball Association broadcasters
Kapampangan people
Magnolia Hotshots coaches
People from Parañaque
Point guards
Shooting guards
Sta. Lucia Realtors players
Tanduay Rhum Masters players
De La Salle Green Archers basketball players
Jason
Sta. Lucia Realtors draft picks